Ernest Lloyd "Sonny" Hutchins (May 17, 1929 – November 21, 2005) was a stock car driver who raced in NASCAR's Grand National/Winston Cup Series from 1955 to 1974. He died in 2005.

Motorsports career results

NASCAR
(key) (Bold – Pole position awarded by qualifying time. Italics – Pole position earned by points standings or practice time. * – Most laps led.)

Grand National Series

Winston Cup Series

References

External links
NASCAR career statistics at racing-reference.info

1929 births
2005 deaths
NASCAR drivers
Sportspeople from Richmond, Virginia
Racing drivers from Virginia